Jim Sheppard (born 1963) is an American bassist.

James or Jim Sheppard may also refer to:
 James Sheppard (born 1988), Canadian hockey player
 James Sheppard (born c. 1940), American musician singing in Shep and the Limelites
 James Sheppard (MP) (1681–1730), British politician
 James Sheppard (American politician), American police officer and politician
 James Sheppard (cricketer) (1888-1944), Australian cricketer
 James Edgar Sheppard (1845–1921), Canon of Windsor
 A character in the novel The Murder of Roger Ackroyd

See also 
 Jim Shepard (born 1956), American writer
 James E. Shepard (1875–1947), American educator
 James E. Shepherd (1847–1910), American jurist
 James Shepherd (disambiguation)